Jeon Mi-do (born August 4, 1982) is a South Korean actress and singer. She is known for her role as Dr. Chae Song-hwa in Hospital Playlist.  In 2022, Jeon appeared in lead role alongside Son Ye-jin and Kim Ji-hyun in JTBC's TV series Thirty, Nine, a romantic drama about three friends.

Career

2006-2018: Beginnings 
Jeon made her acting debut in the musical Mr. Mouse in 2006 and has had a long career since then acting in plays and musicals.

Jeon made her television debut in the 2018 series Mother in which she played a minor role. The following year, she made her big screen debut in the fantasy film Metamorphosis.

2019–present: Rise in popularity and lead roles 
Jeon landed her first lead role in a television series with the medical drama Hospital Playlist. When she first auditioned, she thought it was to play one of the patients but director Shin Won-ho told her he was considering her for the lead role. During an interview, director Shin said that "Although we make the character, [we] felt she was destined to play Song-hwa." Her performance earned her a nomination for Best New Actress in the television category at the 56th Baeksang Arts Awards. For the drama's soundtrack, she sang a cover of Shin Hyo-beom's song "I Knew I Love" (사랑하게 될 줄 알았어) which was originally released in 2006. It peaked at number 1 on the Gaon Digital Chart.

In 2022, Jeon appeared alongside Son Ye-jin and Kim Ji-hyun in JTBC's TV series Thirty, Nine, a drama that revolves around three friends.

Personal life 
In 2013, Jeon Mi-do married her non-celebrity boyfriend whom she dated for 6 months.

Filmography

Film

Television series

Television shows

Stage

Play

Musical

Discography

Cast recording

Television soundtracks

Awards and nominations

Listicles

State honors

Notes

References

External links
 
 
Jeon Mi-do on Instagram

1982 births
Living people
South Korean television actresses
South Korean stage actresses
South Korean musical theatre actresses
South Korean Protestants
South Korean film actresses
21st-century South Korean actresses